Events in the year 1983 in Portugal.

Incumbents
President: António Ramalho Eanes
Prime Minister: Mário Soares

Events
27 July – Turkish embassy attack in Lisbon.

Arts and entertainment

Sports
Football (soccer) competitions: Primeira Liga
 8 and 14 December - 1983 Supertaça Cândido de Oliveira

Births

13 August – Francisco Adam, actor (died 2006).
6 November – Gisela João, fado singer

Deaths
19 August – José Baptista Pinheiro de Azevedo naval officer and politician (born 1917)

References

 
1980s in Portugal
Portugal
Years of the 20th century in Portugal
Portugal